Eric Maurincomme is a French engineer, ex-CEO and Dean of INSA Lyon. Prior to that, he worked as a Vice President at Agfa Healthcare (Belgium). He is an expert on eHealth and has served during many years as the COCIR Healthcare IT Committee Chairman.

Education
He went to high school at the Lycée Pontus de Thiard in Chalon-sur-Saône. He then graduated summa cum laude as an engineer from the Institut national des sciences appliquées de Lyon (Lyon, France) in 1988.  During the academic year 1986-1987, he enrolled as en exchange student at the University of Technology in Sydney (Australia). He then obtained a M. Sc. in Electrical Engineering at the University of California, Davis (United States) in 1990. In 1994 he received a Ph.D. in Biomedical Engineering, also from the Institut national des sciences appliquées de Lyon. He worked as a research assistant at the Leiden University Medical Center in 1993-1994.

Career
Eric Maurincomme started his career at GE Healthcare as an R&D Project leader, from July 1994 until August 1999. From August 1999 until September 2000 he was Global Neurovascular Product Manager at GE Healthcare. From 2000 until 2004 he worked at GE Healthcare as Global Segment Manager Cardiovascular. In June 2004, he joined Agfa HealthCare as Vice President Business Development until January 2007. In January 2007 he became Vice President eHealth and from January 2008 added the responsibility of Vice President Marketing, Communication, Business Development (Chief Marketing & Stragey Officer) at Agfa Healthcare.

In March 2011, he was elected director of his "alma mater", INSA Lyon. He was re-elected in March 2016 for a second and final mandate.

In June 2019, he announced his resignation from INSA Lyon in order to go back to industry.

References

 Laurent Launay, Eric Maurincomme, Pierre Bouchet, Jean-Laurent Mallet, Luc Picard, 3D Reconstruction of Cerebral Vessels and Pathologies from a Few Biplane Digital Angiographies, VBC 1996: 123-128
 Jacques Feldmar, Grégoire Malandain, Nicholas Ayache, Sara Fernández-Vidal, Eric Maurincomme, Yves Trousset, Matching 3D MR angiography data and 2D X-ray angiograms, CVRMed 1997: 129-138
 Erwan Kerrien, Marie-Odile Berger, Eric Maurincomme, Laurent Launay, Régis Vaillant, Luc Picard, Fully Automatic 3D/2D Subtracted Angiography Registration, MICCAI 1999: 664-671

Sources

Eric Maurincomme (EHRWorkshop)
 Canadian Ehealth and Telemedicine Program
 Eric Maurincomme (ICT 2008)
 INSA Lyon history
 Resignation from INSA Lyon
  Explanation over departure - NewsTank interview
 Exclusive interview with Tribune de Lyon - July 2019

French engineers
Living people
University of California, Davis alumni
Year of birth missing (living people)